Pedro Antonio Valdés Sada is a Mexican astronomer, specialising in extra-solar planets (exoplanets), planetary astronomy and stellar astronomy.

Education 
He took a master's degree in astronomy in 1990 and a doctorate in astronomy in 1993, both at New Mexico State University.

Career 
valdés Sada worked as a research assistant and telescope operator at the McDonald Observatory of the University of Texas in Austin. For over five years he was a teaching assistant and researcher at New Mexico State University.
Between 1993 and 1996 he was resident associate researcher at NASA's Goddard Space Center  en 1993–1996. In 1997, he started as an associate teacher and researcher at the Universidad de Monterrey (UDEM).

He has a programme on the university's radio station, on the subject of the exploration of constellations and stars.

Research projects 
 High-resolution infrared spectroscopy of planet Jupiter: Comparisons between Earth-based observations of hydrocarbons and those made in space. 
 Polarimetric observations of regions around active sunspots – MgI.
 Photometry and astrometry of asteroids. 
 Stellar occultations by planets, moons and asteroids.
 Photometry of the transits of extra-solar planets and variable stars.
 Photometry of mutual eclipsing and occultation events of binary asteroids.

Memberships 
 Sociedad Mexicana de Astrobiología
 American Association of Variable Star Observers
 Planetary Society
 International Occultation Timing Association
 Astronomical Society of the Pacific
 American Astronomical Union
 International Astronomical Union
 Division of Planetary Sciences
 American Astronomical Society
 Mexican Sistema Nacional de Investigadores, Level 1.

References

 
 
 
 

Academic staff of the University of Monterrey
Mexican astronomers
Mexican astrophysicists